Kiss is a 1963 silent American experimental film directed by Andy Warhol, which runs 50 minutes and features various couples – man and woman, woman and woman, man and man – kissing for 3½ minutes each. The film features Naomi Levine, Barbara Rubin, Gerard Malanga, Rufus Collins, Johnny Dodd, Ed Sanders, Mark Lancaster, Fred Herko, Baby Jane Holzer, Robert Indiana, Andrew Meyer, John Palmer, Pierre Restany, Harold Stevenson, Philip van Rensselaer, Charlotte Gilbertson, Marisol, Steven Holden, and unidentified others.

In 1964, La Monte Young provided a loud minimalist drone soundtrack to Kiss when shown as small TV-sized projections at the entrance lobby to the third New York Film Festival held at Lincoln Center.

Kiss was followed by Eat (1963), Sleep (1964), Blow Job (1963) and Blue Movie (1969).

This was one of the first films Warhol made at The Factory in New York City.

See also

 Andy Warhol filmography
 Blue Movie (1969)
 Eat (1964)
 Sleep (1963)

References

External links
 Kiss at IMDB

1963 films
Films directed by Andy Warhol
American independent films
1960s American films